Aisa Tuluga (1899 – 1970) was an Inuit artist.

His work is included in the collections of the Musée national des beaux-arts du Québec and the Birmingham Museum of Art.

References

1899 births
1970 deaths
20th-century Canadian artists
Inuit artists
Canadian male artists
People from Nunavik
Inuit from Quebec
Artists from Quebec
20th-century Canadian male artists